Michael Rainey Jr. (born September 22, 2000) is an American actor best known for the role of Tariq St. Patrick on Power and Power Book II: Ghost. He also starred as Michael Burset in Orange Is the New Black and Jalen in Barbershop: The Next Cut.

Early life and education 
Rainey Jr. was born in Louisville, Kentucky, the son of Michael Rainey Sr. and Shauna Small. Through his mother, he is of Jamaican descent. His father is from New York, with Rainey Jr. being raised in Staten Island, New York from the age of 1. Rainey Jr. supports ‘Find and Feed’, an Indiana based organization that cares for the homeless.

Career 
Rainey Jr. began his career at the age of ten when featured in Un Altro Mundo, and followed it with appearances in a variety of movies and shows such as Orange is the New Black, Barbershop, Amateur, 211 and Power.

Rainey Jr. currently stars as Tariq St. Patrick on the expanded Power franchise, Book II, for which he plays the shows leading character.

In March 2022, Rainey Jr., along with Power co-star Gianni Paolo, launched Twenty Two Entertainment. The first project is the self-hosted podcast, The Crew Has It. Twenty Two Entertainment is fully funded by Artists For Artists, launched in December 2021 by Kenan Thompson and John Ryan Jr.

Filmography

Film

Television

References

External links

2000 births
Living people
Male actors from Louisville, Kentucky
21st-century American male actors
American male television actors